Jorge Arturo Dip Calderón is a Chilean lawyer and politician, governor of the province of Valparaíso between 2016 and 2018. He is a member of the Christian Democratic Party.

Career
He is a lawyer from the University of Valparaíso. 
He served as Seremi of National Assets in the Valparaíso Region from 2014 to 2016, where he was in charge of property investigations in the fifth region of the defunct Cema Chile, then chaired by Lucía Hiriart, widow of dictator Augusto Pinochet.
Later he was appointed Governor of the Province of Valparaíso. During his administration, he prohibited the visiting public from entering the Sausalito Stadium, for not having the necessary security measures, an issue resisted by the Everton club authorities, although finally resolved by the leadership of the club equipment. Parliamentarians from the UDI and Amplitude demanded his removal from office due to incidents caused by Colo-Colo baristasin a match with Santiago Wanderers.

Likewise, during his administration, activities were promoted for the reactivation of tourism. 
After leaving his position, he became director of administration and logistics at the University of Valparaíso, in charge of coordinating the collaboration of said university with the Constitutional Convention 16-17-18 together with other tasks for the operation of the University Convention.

References

Chilean politicians
Living people
University of Valparaíso alumni
Christian Democratic Party (Chile) politicians
1981 births